This list of kings and reigning queens of the Kingdom of England begins with Alfred the Great, who initially ruled Wessex, one of the seven Anglo-Saxon kingdoms which later made up modern England. Alfred styled himself King of the Anglo-Saxons from about 886, and while he was not the first king to claim to rule all of the English, his rule represents the start of the first unbroken line of kings to rule the whole of England, the House of Wessex.

Arguments are made for a few different kings thought to have controlled enough Anglo-Saxon kingdoms to be deemed the first king of England. For example, Offa of Mercia and Egbert of Wessex are sometimes described as kings of England by popular writers, but it is no longer the majority view of historians that their wide dominions are part of a process leading to a unified England. Historian Simon Keynes states, for example, that "Offa was driven by a lust for power, not a vision of English unity; and what he left was a reputation, not a legacy." This refers to a period in the late 8th century when Offa achieved a dominance over many of the kingdoms of southern England, but this did not survive his death in 796. Likewise, in 829 Egbert of Wessex conquered Mercia, but he soon lost control of it.

It was not until the late 9th century that one kingdom, Wessex, had become the dominant Anglo-Saxon kingdom. Its king, Alfred the Great, was overlord of western Mercia and used the title King of the Angles and Saxons, but he never ruled eastern and northern England, which was then known as the Danelaw, having earlier been conquered by the Danes from southern Scandinavia. His son Edward the Elder conquered the eastern Danelaw, but Edward's son Æthelstan became the first king to rule the whole of England when he conquered Northumbria in 927, and he is regarded by some modern historians as the first true king of England. The standard title for monarchs from Æthelstan until John was "King of the English". Cnut the Great, a Dane, was the first to call himself "King of England". From John's reign onwards all other titles were eschewed in favour of "King" or "Queen of England".

The Principality of Wales was incorporated into the Kingdom of England under the Statute of Rhuddlan in 1284, and in 1301 King Edward I invested his eldest son, the future King Edward II, as Prince of Wales. Since that time, the eldest sons of all English monarchs, except for King Edward III, have borne this title.

After the death of Queen Elizabeth I without issue in 1603, King James VI of Scotland inherited the English crown as James I of England, joining the crowns of England and Scotland in personal union. By royal proclamation, James styled himself "King of Great Britain", but no such kingdom was actually created until 1707, when England and Scotland united during the reign of Queen Anne to form the new Kingdom of Great Britain, with a single British parliament sitting at Westminster. This marked the end of the Kingdom of England as a sovereign state.

House of Wessex

|-
| AlfredAlfred the Greatc. 886–26 October 899(13 years)
| 
| 849Son of Æthelwulf of Wessexand Osburh
| Ealhswith of Gainsborough8685 children
| 26 October 899Aged about 50
| Son of Æthelwulf of WessexTreaty of Wedmore

|-
| Edward the Elder26 October 899–17 July 924()
| 
| Son of Alfredand Ealhswith
|  Ecgwynn2 children Ælfflæd8 children Eadgifu of Kent4 children
| 17 July 924Aged about 50
| Son of Alfred

|}

|}

|-
| ÆthelstanÆthelstan the Glorious924–27 October 939(14–15 years)
| 
| 894Son of Edward the Elderand Ecgwynn
| Unmarried
| 27 October 939Aged about 45
| Son of Edward the Elder

|-
| Edmund IEdmund the Magnificent27 October 939–26 May 946()
| 
| Son of Edward the Elderand Eadgifu of Kent
|  Ælfgifu of Shaftesbury2 sons Æthelflæd of Damerham944No children
| 26 May 946PucklechurchKilled in a brawl aged about 25
| Son of Edward the Elder

|-
| Eadred26 May 946–23 November 955()
| 
| Son of Edward the Elderand Eadgifu of Kent
| Unmarried
| 23 November 955FromeAged about 32
| Son of Edward the Elder

|-
| EadwigEadwig All-Fair23 November 955–1 October 959()
| 
| Son of Edmund Iand Ælfgifu of Shaftesbury
| ÆlfgifuNo verified children
| 1 October 959Aged about 19
| Son of Edmund I

|-
| Edgar the Peaceful1 October 959–8 July 975()
| 
| WessexSon of Edmund Iand Ælfgifu of Shaftesbury
|  Æthelflæd1 son Ælfthryth2 sons
| 8 July 975WinchesterAged 31
| Son of Edmund I

|-
| Edward the Martyr8 July 975–18 March 978()
| 
| Son of Edgar the Peacefuland Æthelflæd
| Unmarried
| 18 March 978Corfe CastleMurdered aged about 16
| Son of Edgar the Peaceful

|-
| (1st reign)Æthelred the Unready18 March 978–1013(34–35 years)
| 
| Son of Edgar the Peacefuland Ælfthryth
|  Ælfgifu of York9919 children Emma of Normandy10023 children
| 23 April 1016LondonAged about 48
| Son of Edgar the Peaceful

|}

House of Denmark

England came under the control of Sweyn Forkbeard, a Danish king, after an invasion in 1013, during which Æthelred abandoned the throne and went into exile in Normandy.

|-
| SweynSweyn Forkbeard25 December 1013–3 February 1014()
| 
| 17 April 963DenmarkSon of Harald Bluetoothand either Tove or Gunhild
|  Gunhild of Wenden7 children Sigrid the Haughty1 daughter
| 3 February 1014GainsboroughAged 50
| Right of conquest

|}

House of Wessex (restored, first time)
Following the death of Sweyn Forkbeard, Æthelred the Unready returned from exile and was again proclaimed king on 3 February 1014. His son succeeded him after being chosen king by the citizens of London and a part of the Witan, despite ongoing Danish efforts to wrest the crown from the West Saxons.

|-
| (2nd reign)Æthelred the Unready3 February 1014–23 April 1016()
| 
| Son of Edgar the Peacefuland Ælfthryth
|  Ælfgifu of York9919 children Emma of Normandy10023 children
| 23 April 1016LondonAged about 48
| Son of Edgar the Peaceful

|-
| Edmund Ironside23 April 1016–30 November 1016()
| 
| Son of Æthelredand Ælfgifu of York
| Edith of East Anglia2 children
| 30 November 1016GlastonburyAged 26
| Son of Æthelred

|}

House of Denmark (restored)
Following the decisive Battle of Assandun on 18 October 1016, King Edmund signed a treaty with Cnut (Canute) under which all of England except for Wessex would be controlled by Cnut. Upon Edmund's death just over a month later on 30 November, Cnut ruled the whole kingdom as its sole king for nineteen years.

| CnutCnut the Great18 October 1016–12 November 1035()
|  
| Son of Sweyn Forkbeardand Gunhilda of Poland
|  Ælfgifu of Northampton2 sons Emma of Normandy10172 children
| 12 November 1035ShaftesburyAged about 40
| Son of SweynTreaty of Deerhurst

|-
| Harold Harefoot12 November 1035–17 March 1040()
| 
| Son of Cnut the Greatand Ælfgifu of Northampton
| 
| 17 March 1040OxfordAged about 24
| Son of Cnut the Great

|-
| Harthacnut17 March 1040–8 June 1042()
| 
| 1018Son of Cnut the Greatand Emma of Normandy
| Unmarried
| 8 June 1042LambethAged about 24
| Son of Cnut the Great

|}

House of Wessex (restored, second time)
After Harthacnut, there was a Saxon Restoration between 1042 and 1066.

|-
| Edward the Confessor8 June 1042–5 January 1066()
| 
| IslipSon of Æthelredand Emma of Normandy
| Edith of Wessex23 January 1045No children
| 5 January 1066Westminster PalaceAged about 63
| Son of Æthelred

|}

House of Godwin

|-
| Harold IIHarold Godwinson6 January 1066–14 October 1066()
| 
| Son of Godwin of Wessexand Gytha Thorkelsdóttir
|  Edith Swannesha5 children Ealdgyth2 sons
| 14 October 1066HastingsDied in the Battle of Hastings aged 44
| Supposedly named heir by Edward the ConfessorElected by the Witenagemot

|}

|}

House of Normandy

In 1066, several rival claimants to the English throne emerged. Among them were Harold Godwinson (recognised as king by the Witenagemot after the death of Edward the Confessor), Harald Hardrada (King of Norway who claimed to be the rightful heir of Harthacnut) and Duke William II of Normandy (vassal to the King of France, and first cousin once-removed of Edward the Confessor). Harald and William both invaded separately in 1066. Godwinson successfully repelled the invasion by Hardrada, but ultimately lost the throne of England in the Norman conquest of England.

After the Battle of Hastings on 14 October 1066, William the Conqueror made permanent the recent removal of the capital from Winchester to London. Following the death of Harold Godwinson at Hastings, the Anglo-Saxon Witenagemot elected as king Edgar Ætheling, the son of Edward the Exile and grandson of Edmund Ironside. The young monarch was unable to resist the invaders and was never crowned. William was crowned King William I of England on Christmas Day 1066, in Westminster Abbey, and is today known as William the Conqueror, William the Bastard or William I.

|-
| William IWilliam the Conqueror25 December 1066–9 September 1087()
| 
| Falaise CastleSon of Robert the Magnificentand Herleva
| Matilda of FlandersNormandy10539 children
| 9 September 1087RouenAged about 59
| Supposedly named heir in 1052 by Edward the ConfessorFirst cousin once removed of Edward the ConfessorRight of conquest

|-
| William IIWilliam Rufus26 September 1087–2 August 1100()
| 
| NormandySon of William the Conquerorand Matilda of Flanders
| Unmarried
| 2 August 1100New ForestShot with an arrow aged 44
| Son of William IGranted the Kingdom of England over elder brother Robert Curthose (who remained the Duke of Normandy)

|-
| Henry IHenry Beauclerc5 August 1100–1 December 1135()
| 
| September 1068SelbySon of William the Conquerorand Matilda of Flanders
|  Matilda of ScotlandWestminster Abbey11 November 11002 children Adeliza of LouvainWindsor Castle29 January 1121No children
| 1 December 1135Saint-Denis-en-LyonsAged 67
| Son of William ISeizure of the Crown (from Robert Curthose)

|}

House of Blois

Henry I left no legitimate male heirs, his son William Adelin having died in the White Ship disaster of 1120. This ended the direct Norman line of kings in England. Henry named his eldest daughter, Matilda (Countess of Anjou by her second marriage to Geoffrey Plantagenet, Count of Anjou, as well as widow of her first husband, Henry V, Holy Roman Emperor), as his heir. Before naming Matilda as heir, he had been in negotiations to name his nephew Stephen of Blois as his heir. When Henry died, Stephen travelled to England, and in a coup d'etat had himself crowned instead of Matilda. The period which followed is known as The Anarchy, as parties supporting each side fought in open warfare both in Britain and on the continent for the better part of two decades.

|-
| StephenStephen of Blois22 December 1135–25 October 1154()
| 
| BloisSon of Stephen II of Bloisand Adela of Normandy
| Matilda of BoulogneWestminster11256 children
| 25 October 1154Dover CastleAged about 58
| Grandson of William IAppointmentusurpation

|}

Count Eustace IV of Boulogne (c. 1130 – 17 August 1153) was appointed co-king of England by his father, King Stephen, on 6 April 1152, in order to guarantee his succession to the throne (as was the custom in France, but not in England). The Pope and the Church would not agree to this, and Eustace was not crowned. Eustace died the next year aged 23, during his father's lifetime, and so never became king in his own right.

|}

House of Anjou/Plantagenet

King Stephen came to an agreement with Matilda in November 1153 with the signing of the Treaty of Wallingford, in which Stephen recognised Henry, son of Matilda and her second husband Geoffrey Plantagenet, Count of Anjou, as the designated heir. The royal house descended from Matilda and Geoffrey is widely known by two names, the House of Anjou (after Geoffrey's title as Count of Anjou) or the House of Plantagenet, after his sobriquet. Some historians prefer to group the subsequent kings into two groups, before and after the loss of the bulk of their French possessions, although they are not different royal houses.

The Angevins (from the French term meaning "from Anjou") ruled over the Angevin Empire during the 12th and 13th centuries, an area stretching from the Pyrenees to Ireland. They did not regard England as their primary home until most of their continental domains were lost by King John. The direct, eldest male line from Henry II includes monarchs commonly grouped together as the House of Plantagenet, which was the name given to the dynasty after the loss of most of their continental possessions, while cadet branches of this line became known as the House of Lancaster and the House of York during the War of the Roses.

The Angevins formulated England's royal coat of arms, which usually showed other kingdoms held or claimed by them or their successors, although without representation of Ireland for quite some time. Dieu et mon droit was first used as a battle cry by Richard I in 1198 at the Battle of Gisors, when he defeated the forces of Philip II of France. It has generally been used as the motto of English monarchs since being adopted by Edward III.

|-
| Henry IIHenry Curtmantle19 December 1154–6 July 1189()
| 
| 
| 5 March 1133Le MansSon of Geoffrey V of Anjouand Matilda
| Eleanor of AquitaineBordeaux Cathedral18 May 11528 children
| 6 July 1189ChinonAged 56
| Grandson of Henry ITreaty of Wallingford

|-
| colspan=99 | Henry II named his son, Henry the Young King (1155–1183), as co-ruler with him but this was a Norman custom of designating an heir, and the younger Henry did not outlive his father and rule in his own right, so he is not counted as a monarch on lists of kings.

|-
| Richard IRichard the Lionheart3 September 1189–6 April 1199()
| 
| rowspan=2 | 
| 8 September 1157Beaumont PalaceSon of Henry IIand Eleanor of Aquitaine
| Berengaria of NavarreLimassol12 May 1191No children
| 6 April 1199ChâlusShot by a quarrel aged 41
| Son of Henry IIPrimogeniture

|-
| JohnJohn Lackland27 May 1199–19 October 1216()
| 
| 24 December 1166Beaumont PalaceSon of Henry IIand Eleanor of Aquitaine
|  Isabel of GloucesterMarlborough Castle29 August 1189No children Isabella of AngoulêmeBordeaux Cathedral24 August 12005 children
| 19 October 1216Newark-on-TrentAged 49
| Son of Henry IINominationProximity of blood

|}

|}

House of Plantagenet

The House of Plantagenet takes its name from Geoffrey Plantagenet, Count of Anjou, husband of Empress Matilda and father of Henry II. The name Plantagenet itself was unknown as a family name per se until Richard of York adopted it as his family name in the 15th century. It has since been retroactively applied to English monarchs from Henry II onward. It is common among modern historians to refer to Henry II and his sons as the "Angevins" due to their vast continental empire, and most of the Angevin kings before John spent more time in their continental possessions than in England.

It is from the time of Henry III, after the loss of most of the family's continental possessions, that the Plantagenet kings became more English in nature. The Houses of Lancaster and York are cadet branches of the House of Plantagenet.

|-
| Henry IIIHenry of Winchester28 October 1216–16 November 1272()
| 
| rowspan=3 | 
| 1 October 1207Winchester CastleSon of Johnand Isabella of Angoulême
| Eleanor of ProvenceCanterbury Cathedral14 January 12365 children
| 16 November 1272Westminster PalaceAged 65
| Son of JohnPrimogeniture

|-
| Edward IEdward Longshanks20 November 1272–7 July 1307()
| 
| 17 June 1239Palace of WestminsterSon of Henry IIIand Eleanor of Provence
|  Eleanor of CastileAbbey of Santa María la Real de Las Huelgas18 October 125416 children Margaret of FranceCanterbury10 September 12993 children
| 7 July 1307Burgh by SandsAged 68
| Son of Henry IIIPrimogeniture

|-
| Edward IIEdward of Caernarfon8 July 1307–Abdicated 20 January 1327()
| 
| 25 April 1284Caernarfon CastleSon of Edward Iand Eleanor of Castile
| Isabella of FranceBoulogne Cathedral24 January 13084 children
| 21 September 1327Berkeley CastleMurdered aged 43
| Son of Edward IPrimogeniture

|-
| Edward IIIEdward of Windsor25 January 1327–21 June 1377()
| 
| 
| 13 November 1312Windsor CastleSon of Edward IIand Isabella of France
| Philippa of HainaultYork Minster25 January 132814 children
| 21 June 1377Sheen PalaceAged 64
| Son of Edward IIPrimogeniture

|-
| Richard IIRichard of Bordeaux22 June 1377–29 September 1399()
| 
| 
| 6 January 1367BordeauxSon of Edward the Black Princeand Joan of Kent
|  Anne of Bohemia14 January 1382No children Isabella of ValoisCalais4 November 1396No children
| 14 February 1400Pontefract CastleAged 33
| Grandson of Edward IIIPrimogeniture

|}

House of Lancaster

This house descended from Edward III's third surviving son, John of Gaunt. Henry IV seized power from Richard II (and also displaced the next in line to the throne, Edmund Mortimer (then aged 7), a descendant of Edward III's second son, Lionel of Antwerp).

|-
| Henry IVHenry of Bolingbroke30 September 1399–20 March 1413()
| 
| 
|  April 1367Bolingbroke CastleSon of John of Gauntand Blanche of Lancaster
|  Mary de BohunArundel Castle27 July 13806 children Joanna of NavarreWinchester Cathedral7 February 1403No children
| 20 March 1413Westminster AbbeyAged 45
| Grandsonheir male of Edward IIIUsurpation

|-
| Henry VHenry of Monmouth21 March 1413–31 August 1422()
| 
| 
| 16 September 1386Monmouth CastleSon of Henry IVand Mary de Bohun
| Catherine of ValoisTroyes Cathedral2 June 14201 son
| 31 August 1422Château de VincennesAged 35
| Son of Henry IVAgnatic primogeniture

|-
| (1st reign)Henry VI1 September 1422–4 March 1461()
| 
| 
| 6 December 1421Windsor CastleSon of Henry Vand Catherine of Valois
| Margaret of AnjouTitchfield Abbey22 April 14451 son
| 21 May 1471Tower of LondonAllegedly murdered aged 49
| Son of Henry VAgnatic primogeniture

|}

House of York

The House of York claimed the right to the throne through Edward III's second surviving son, Lionel of Antwerp, but it inherited its name from Edward's fourth surviving son, Edmund of Langley, first Duke of York.

The Wars of the Roses (1455–1485) saw the throne pass back and forth between the rival houses of Lancaster and York.

|-
| (1st reign)Edward IV4 March 1461–3 October 1470()
| 
| 
| 28 April 1442RouenSon of Richard of Yorkand Cecily Neville
| Elizabeth WoodvilleGrafton Regis1 May 146410 children
| 9 April 1483Westminster PalaceAged 40
| Great-great-grandsonheir general of Edward IIISeizure of the CrownAct of Accord

|}

House of Lancaster (restored)

|-
| (2nd reign)Henry VI3 October 1470–11 April 1471()
| 
| 
| 6 December 1421Windsor CastleSon of Henry Vand Catherine of Valois
| Margaret of AnjouTitchfield Abbey22 April 14451 son
| 21 May 1471Tower of LondonAllegedly murdered aged 49
| Son of Henry VSeizure of the Crown

|}

House of York (restored)

|-
| (2nd reign)Edward IV11 April 1471–9 April 1483()
| 
| rowspan=3 | 
| 28 April 1442RouenSon of Richard of Yorkand Cecily Neville
| Elizabeth WoodvilleGrafton Regis1 May 146410 children
| 9 April 1483Westminster PalaceAged 40
| Great-great-grandsonheir general of Edward IIISeizure of the CrownAct of Accord

|-
| Edward V9 April 1483–25 June 1483()
| 
| 2 November 1470WestminsterSon of Edward IVand Elizabeth Woodville
| Unmarried
| Disappeared mid-1483LondonAllegedly murdered aged 12
| Son of Edward IVPrimogeniture

|-
| Richard III26 June 1483–22 August 1485()
| 
| 2 October 1452Fotheringhay CastleSon of Richard of Yorkand Cecily Neville
| Anne NevilleWestminster Abbey12 July 14721 son
| 22 August 1485Bosworth FieldKilled in battle aged 32
| Great-great-grandson of Edward IIITitulus Regius

|}

House of Tudor

The Tudors descended in the female line from John Beaufort, one of the illegitimate children of John of Gaunt (third surviving son of Edward III), by Gaunt's long-term mistress Katherine Swynford. Those descended from English monarchs only through an illegitimate child would normally have no claim on the throne, but the situation was complicated when Gaunt and Swynford eventually married in 1396 (25 years after John Beaufort's birth). In view of the marriage, the church retroactively declared the Beauforts legitimate via a papal bull the same year. Parliament did the same in an Act in 1397. A subsequent proclamation by John of Gaunt's legitimate son, King Henry IV, also recognised the Beauforts' legitimacy, but declared them ineligible ever to inherit the throne. Nevertheless, the Beauforts remained closely allied with Gaunt's other descendants, the Royal House of Lancaster.

John Beaufort's granddaughter Lady Margaret Beaufort was married to Edmund Tudor. Tudor was the son of Welsh courtier Owain Tudur (anglicised to Owen Tudor) and Catherine of Valois, the widow of the Lancastrian King Henry V. Edmund Tudor and his siblings were either illegitimate, or the product of a secret marriage, and owed their fortunes to the goodwill of their legitimate half-brother King Henry VI. When the House of Lancaster fell from power, the Tudors followed.

By the late 15th century, the Tudors were the last hope for the Lancaster supporters. Edmund Tudor's son became king as Henry VII after defeating Richard III at the Battle of Bosworth Field in 1485, winning the Wars of the Roses. King Henry married Elizabeth of York, daughter of Edward IV, thereby uniting the Lancastrian and York lineages. (See family tree.)

|-
| Henry VII22 August 1485–21 April 1509()
| 
| rowspan=3 | 
| 28 January 1457Pembroke CastleSon of Edmund Tudorand Margaret Beaufort
| Elizabeth of YorkWestminster Abbey18 January 14868 children
| 21 April 1509Richmond PalaceAged 52
| Great-great-great-grandson of Edward IIIRight of conquestMarriage to Elizabeth of York

|-
| Henry VIII22 April 1509–28 January 1547()
| 
| 28 June 1491Greenwich PalaceSon of Henry VIIand Elizabeth of York
|  Catherine of AragonGreenwich11 June 15091 daughter Anne BoleynWestminster Palace25 January 15331 daughter Jane SeymourWhitehall Palace30 May 15361 son3 further marriagesNo more children
| 28 January 1547Whitehall PalaceAged 55
| Son of Henry VIIPrimogeniture

|-
| Edward VI28 January 1547–6 July 1553()
| 
| 12 October 1537Hampton Court PalaceSon of Henry VIIIand Jane Seymour
| Unmarried
| 6 July 1553Greenwich PalaceAged 15
| Son of Henry VIIIPrimogeniture

|}

|}

|-
| Mary IBloody Mary19 July 1553–17 November 1558()
| 
| rowspan=2 | 
| 18 February 1516Greenwich PalaceDaughter of Henry VIIIand Catherine of Aragon
| Philip II of SpainWinchester Cathedral25 July 1554No children
| 17 November 1558St James's PalaceAged 42
| Daughter of Henry VIIIThird Succession Act

|-
| (Jure uxoris)PhilipPhilip the Prudent25 July 1554–17 November 1558()
| 
| 21 May 1527ValladolidSon of Charles V of the Holy Roman Empireand Isabella of Portugal
| Mary I of EnglandWinchester Cathedral25 July 1554No children3 other marriages7 children
| 13 September 1598El EscorialAged 71
| Husband of Mary IAct for the Marriage of Queen Mary to Philip of Spain

|- 
| colspan=99 align=left |

Under the terms of the marriage treaty between Philip I of Naples (later Philip II of Spain from 15 January 1556) and Queen Mary I, Philip was to enjoy Mary's titles and honours for as long as their marriage should last. All official documents, including Acts of Parliament, were to be dated with both their names, and Parliament was to be called under the joint authority of the couple. An Act of Parliament gave him the title of king and stated that he "shall aid her Highness ... in the happy administration of her Grace's realms and dominions" (although elsewhere the Act stated that Mary was to be "sole queen"). Nonetheless, Philip was to co-reign with his wife.

|-
| Elizabeth IThe Virgin Queen17 November 1558–24 March 1603()
| 
| 
| 7 September 1533Greenwich PalaceDaughter of Henry VIIIand Anne Boleyn
| Unmarried
| 24 March 1603Richmond PalaceAged 69
| Daughter of Henry VIIIThird Succession Act

|}

House of Stuart

Elizabeth's cousin, King James VI of Scotland, succeeded to the English throne as James I in the Union of the Crowns. James was descended from the Tudors through his great-grandmother, Margaret Tudor, the eldest daughter of Henry VII and wife of James IV of Scotland. In 1604, he adopted the title King of Great Britain. However, the two parliaments remained separate until the Acts of Union 1707.

|-
| James I24 March 1603–27 March 1625()
| 
| rowspan=2 | 
| 19 June 1566Edinburgh CastleSon of Mary, Queen of Scots, and Henry Stuart, Lord Darnley
| Anne of DenmarkOslo23 November 15897 children
| 27 March 1625Theobalds HouseAged 58
| Great-great-grandsonheir general of Henry VII

|-
| Charles I27 March 1625–30 January 1649()
| 
| 19 November 1600Dunfermline PalaceSon of James Iand Anne of Denmark
| Henrietta Maria of FranceSt Augustine's Abbey13 June 16259 children
| 30 January 1649Whitehall PalaceExecuted aged 48
| Son of James ICognatic primogeniture

|}

First Interregnum

No monarch reigned after the 1649 execution of Charles I. Between 1649 and 1653, there was no single English head of state, as England was ruled directly by the Rump Parliament with the English Council of State acting as executive power during a period known as the Commonwealth of England.

After a coup d'etat in 1653, Oliver Cromwell forcibly took control of England from Parliament. He dissolved the Rump Parliament at the head of a military force and England entered The Protectorate period, under Cromwell's direct control with the title Lord Protector.

It was within the power of the Lord Protector to choose his heir and Oliver Cromwell chose his eldest son, Richard Cromwell, to succeed him.

|-
| Oliver Cromwell16 December 1653–3 September 1658()
| 
| rowspan=2 | 
| 25 April 1599HuntingdonSon of Robert Cromwelland Elizabeth Steward
| Elizabeth BourchierSt Giles22 August 16209 children
| 3 September 1658WhitehallAged 59

|-
| Richard Cromwell3 September 1658–7 May 1659()
| 
| 4 October 1626HuntingdonSon of Oliver Cromwelland Elizabeth Bourchier
| Dorothy MaijorMay 16499 children
| 12 July 1712CheshuntAged 85

|}

Richard Cromwell was forcibly removed by the English Committee of Safety in May 1659. England again lacked any single head of state. After almost a year of anarchy, the monarchy was formally restored when Charles II returned from France to accept the throne.

House of Stuart (restored)

The Monarchy was restored under the rule of Charles II.

|-
| Charles II29 May 1660–6 February 1685()
| 
| rowspan=2 | 
| 29 May 1630St James's PalaceSon of Charles Iand Henrietta Maria of France
| Catherine of BraganzaPortsmouth21 May 1662No children
| 6 February 1685Whitehall PalaceAged 54
| Son of Charles ICognatic primogenitureEnglish Restoration

|-
| James II6 February 1685–23 December 1688(Overthrown after )
| 
| 14 October 1633St James's PalaceSon of Charles Iand Henrietta Maria of France
|  Anne HydeThe Strand3 September 16608 children Mary of ModenaDover21 November 16737 children
| 16 September 1701Château de Saint-Germain-en-LayeAged 67
| Son of Charles ICognatic primogeniture

|}

Second Interregnum 1688–1689 

James II was ousted by Parliament less than four years after ascending to the throne, beginning the century's second interregnum. To settle the question of who should replace the deposed monarch, a Convention Parliament elected James' daughter Mary II and her husband (also his nephew) William III co-monarchs, in the Glorious Revolution.

Houses of Stuart and Orange

|-
| Mary II13 February 1689–28 December 1694()
| 
| 
| 30 April 1662St James's PalaceDaughter of James IIand Anne Hyde
| William III of EnglandSt James's Palace4 November 1677No children
| 28 December 1694Kensington PalaceAged 32
| Daughter of James IIOffered the Crown by Parliament

|-
| William IIIWilliam of Orange13 February 1689–8 March 1702()
| 
| 
| 4 November 1650The HagueSon of William II of Orangeand Mary of England
| Mary II of EnglandSt James's Palace4 November 1677No children
| 8 March 1702Kensington PalaceAged 51
| Grandson of Charles IOffered the Crown by Parliament

|-
| Anne8 March 1702–1 May 1707()
| 
| 
| 6 February 1665St James's PalaceDaughter of James IIand Anne Hyde
| George of DenmarkSt James's Palace28 July 16833 children
| 1 August 1714Kensington PalaceAged 49
| Daughter of James IICognatic primogenitureBill of Rights 1689

|}

While James and his descendants continued to claim the throne, all Catholics (such as James and his son Charles) were barred from the throne by the Act of Settlement 1701, enacted by Anne, another of James's Protestant daughters.

With the Acts of Union 1707, England as a sovereign state ceased to exist, replaced by the new Kingdom of Great Britain, see List of British monarchs.

Acts of Union
The Acts of Union 1707 were a pair of Parliamentary Acts passed during 1706 and 1707 by the Parliament of England and the Parliament of Scotland to put into effect the Treaty of Union agreed on 22 July 1706. The acts joined the Kingdom of England and the Kingdom of Scotland (previously separate sovereign states, with separate legislatures but with the same monarch) into the Kingdom of Great Britain.

England, Scotland, and Ireland had shared a monarch for more than a hundred years, since the Union of the Crowns in 1603, when King James VI of Scotland inherited the English and Irish thrones from his first cousin twice removed, Queen Elizabeth I. Although described as a Union of Crowns, until 1707 there were in fact two separate crowns resting on the same head.

There had been attempts in 1606, 1667, and 1689, to unite England and Scotland by Acts of Parliament but it was not until the early 18th century that the idea had the support of both political establishments behind it, albeit for rather different reasons.

Timeline

Titles 

In addition, many of the pre-Norman kings assumed extra titles, as follows:
 Æthelstan:  ("King of the Whole of Britain")
 Eadred:  ("Reigning over the governments of the kingdoms of the Anglo-Saxons, Northumbrians, Pagans, and British")
 Eadwig the Fair:  ("King by the will of God, Emperor of the Anglo-Saxons and Northumbrians, governor of the pagans, commander of the British")
 Edgar the Peaceful:  ("King of all Albion and its neighbouring realms")

The Empress Matilda styled herself  ("Lady of the English").

In 1604 James I, who had inherited the English throne the previous year, adopted the title (now usually rendered in English rather than Latin) King of Great Britain. The English and Scottish parliaments, however, did not recognise this title until the Acts of Union of 1707 under Queen Anne (who was Queen of Great Britain rather than king).

See also 

 Alternative successions of the English and British crown
 Bretwalda
 Demise of the Crown
 Heptarchy
 Succession to the British throne, a historical overview and current rules
 Succession to the British throne#Current line of succession, a list of people
 List of English royal consorts
 Family tree of English monarchs
 Family tree of British monarchs
 List of office holders of the United Kingdom and predecessor states
 List of British monarchs
 Lists of monarchs in the British Isles
 List of Irish monarchs
 List of monarchs of the British Isles by cause of death
 List of monarchs of Wessex, AD 519 to 927
 List of rulers of Wales
 List of Scottish monarchs
 Mnemonic verses of monarchs in England
 List of legendary kings of Britain

Explanatory notes

Coronations

Burials

References

Citations

General sources

External links 

 

 

927 establishments
Monarchs
English